Blonde Fever is a 1944 American comedy film directed by Richard Whorf and starring Philip Dorn, Mary Astor, Felix Bressart, Gloria Grahame. It is also known as Autumn Fever.

Plot
Peter Donay (Philip Dorn) is the not-so-happy owner of the Café Donay, which is a fancy roadside establishment somewhere between Reno and Lake Tahoe in Nevada. His marriage is not what it should be, and he has a gambling addiction.

One day, he meets nightclub waitress Sally Murfin (Gloria Grahame), who is a lot more interested in Peter's money and business than in anything else. Peter’s wife, Delilah (Mary Astor), knows about her husband's love affair and is determined to get rid of Sally by tricking her into believing that there is no money to be had from Peter by telling Sally about the gambling and lying about the business being poor. Her plan does not work, so Delilah tries to split them up by hiring Sally’s beau Freddie Bilson (Marshall Thompson) as a waiter and letting him stay above their garage. Her plan goes to waste when Sally overhears that Peter is the winner of $40,000 in a lottery. Now Sally is more determined to lay her hands on Peter.

Sally's advances on Peter makes Freddie very jealous. Eventually, Freddie pulls a gun on Peter and threatens to shoot him. Peter confesses that he and Sally are in love and going to get married. Delilah asks Peter for a divorce, asking him for the winning lottery ticket as her settlement. Peter refuses at first, but eventually he gives in and gives her the money.

Full of regret, he then tells Sally’s friend Johnny about his mistake, and that he wants his wife back. Sally is outraged when she hears about the settlement and is more interested in Freddie, now that Delilah has bought him a new motorcycle. Sally disappears with Freddie, and Peter begs his wife Delilah for forgiveness, and gets it. It turns out she was bluffing about divorcing and leaving him all along, when her suitcase opens as they kiss and make up, revealing that it is empty.

Cast
Philip Dorn as Peter Donay
Mary Astor as Delilah Donay
Felix Bressart as Johnny
Gloria Grahame as Sally Murfin
Marshall Thompson as Freddie Bilson
Curt Bois as Brillon
Elisabeth Risdon as Mrs. Talford
Arthur Walsh as Willie
Jessica Tandy as diner at inn (uncredited)
Hume Cronyn diner at inn (uncredited)

External links

1944 films
1944 romantic comedy films
American black-and-white films
American romantic comedy films
American films based on plays
Films based on works by Ferenc Molnár
Films directed by Richard Whorf
Metro-Goldwyn-Mayer films
Films scored by Nathaniel Shilkret
1940s American films